Cattle Call is an album by American country music singer Eddy Arnold, released by RCA Victor in August 1963. The album features a number of western standards, as well as a new recording of "The Cattle Call", which was a chart-topping hit for Arnold in 1955. "(Jim) I Wore a Tie Today" had also previously been released as a single. Produced by Chet Atkins, Cattle Call was Arnold's first album to make Billboard's album charts.

Track listing
 "The Streets of Laredo" (Traditional) (3:09)
 "Cool Water" (Bob Nolan) (3:40)
 "Cattle Call" (Tex Owens) (2:46)
 "Leanin' on the Old Top Rail" (Charles Kenny, Nick Kenny) (2:10)
 "Ole Faithful" (Michael Carr, Jimmy Kennedy) (1:54)
 "A Cowboy's Dream" (Traditional) (3:30)
 "The Wayward Wind" (Stanley Lebowsky, Herb Newman) (3:11)
 "Tumbling Tumbleweeds" (Bob Nolan) (2:41)
 "Cowpoke" (Stan Jones) (2:23)
 "Where the Mountains Meet the Sky" (Sammy Kaye) (1:59)
 "Sierra Sue" (Joseph Buell Carey) (2:44)
 "Carry Me Back to the Lone Prairie" (Carson Robison) (2:20)
 "(Jim) I Wore a Tie Today" (Cindy Walker) (2:39)

References

1963 albums
RCA Victor albums
Eddy Arnold albums
Albums produced by Chet Atkins